Allied Air Flight 111 was a cargo flight operated by Lagos-based cargo airliner Allied Air, flying from Lagos, Nigeria to Accra, Ghana. The flight was operated with a Boeing 727 cargo aircraft. On 2 June 2012, the aircraft crashed on landing at Kotoka International Airport, killing ten people on the ground.

The aircraft overran the runway, broke through the airport perimeter fence, and struck a minibus on a roadway. All four crew members on the plane survived, but all 10 aboard the minibus were killed. It was the second deadliest accident in Ghanaian aviation history.

Flight
Allied Air Flight 111 was a flight from Lagos Murtala Muhammed Airport to Kotoka International Airport with 4 crew members aboard. It took off from Lagos at 19:04 local time and was cleared to flight level 240. The flight operated under instrument flight rules (IFR). Weather was reported to be inclement, with turbulence reportedly present.

On approach to Accra, the captain decided to fly an instrument landing system (ILS) approach. However, he later disconnected the autopilot and decided to fly manually.

During landing, the aircraft encountered instrument meteorological conditions (IMS), with rain and zero visibility. Thrust reversers and normal braking were deployed, but proved ineffective. The nose gear remained in the air, and did not touch ground until the aircraft flew into the perimeter fence.

The aircraft overran the runway and impacted the field's threshold lights and approach lights. It then destroyed the ILS localizer, the debris from which struck a passing taxi cab, causing an injury to its occupant. The aircraft then entered crowded Giffard Road, and crushed a minibus with 10 people on board. All aboard were killed. The plane then uprooted a tree, and stopped in an open area near El-Wak Stadium.

All 4 crew members survived the accident with minor injuries.

Investigation 
Investigation by the Ghanaian government's accident investigation commission concluded that the cause of the crash was pilot error. The pilot landed long- 4000' from the threshold of Runway 03. The remaining runway distance was insufficient to allow the plane to come to a stop. The investigation stated that both pilots might have been fixated on landing immediately, regardless of the poor conditions. The flight crew also did not deploy the speed brake, contributing to the aircraft overrunning the runway.

Aircraft
Just over 20 years prior, the same aircraft had performed the final flight for Pan American World Airways from Bridgetown, Barbados to Miami, Florida, USA.

References 

2012 in Ghana
Accidents and incidents involving the Boeing 727
Aviation accidents and incidents in 2012
Aviation accidents and incidents in Ghana
Airliner accidents and incidents involving runway overruns
June 2012 events in Africa
2012 disasters in Ghana